Giovanni Pietro da Cemmo (15th century - 16th century) was an Italian painter.

Details on the artist's life are very scarce: perhaps born in Cemmo, he was active from 1474 to 1504 in a large area including  Brescia and Cremona.

Giovanni Pietro was born into a family of artists. Among the members of his family were  Master Ghirardo and Master Paroto, who in 1447 signed an altarpiece for the Pieve of San Siro in Cemmo.

His style, at least until 1486, is a footprint Lombard-Venetian Gothic style, while the last period between 1498 and 1504 he showed  the  influence of Vincenzo Foppa and Bramante.

References

Bibliography
 Maria Luisa Ferrari, Giovan Pietro da Cemmo. Fatti di pittura bresciana del Quattrocento, Milano, Ceschina, 1956.
 Franco Mazzini, Santa Maria Assunta a Esine. I dipinti murali di Giovan Pietro da Cemmo. I restauri., Azzano San Paolo, Bolis edizioni, 2000.

External links

15th-century births
16th-century deaths
15th-century Italian painters
Italian male painters
16th-century Italian painters
Painters from Brescia